Luiz Henrique Santos or simply Luiz Henrique (born August 24, 1987, in Santo Ângelo), is a Brazilian striker. He currently plays for Goiás.

Made professional debut for Goiás against Flamengo in a 1–3 home defeat in the Campeonato Brasileiro on May 20, 2007.

Contract
7 May 2007 to 30 June 2009

External links
 Jovem Luiz Henrique pode ganhar uma vaga
 Luiz Henrique deve ser a novidade do Goiás
 CBF
 zerozero.pt

References

1987 births
Living people
Brazilian footballers
Goiás Esporte Clube players
Association football forwards